René de Lespinasse (13 October 1843, in Bourges – 16 February 1922, in Nevers) was a French historian and politician.

He was a member of the Société de l'histoire de Paris et de l'Île-de-France (from 1874) and served as president of the Société nivernaise des lettres, sciences et arts.

Selected works 
 Sacramentarium ad usum Æcclesiæ nivernensis (1873).
 Vie et vertus de Saint Louis d'après Guillaume de Nangis et le confesseur de la reine Marguerite (1877).
 Les métiers et corporations de la Ville de Paris (4 volumes, 1879–97).
 XIIIe siècle: le livre des métiers d'Étienne Boileau (with François Bonnardot, 1879). 
 Une famille noble sous la Terreur (1879).
 Le Nivernais et les comtes de Nevers (3 volumes, 1909–14).
 Cartulaire de Saint-Cyr de Nevers (1916).

References 

1843 births
1922 deaths
French medievalists
École Nationale des Chartes alumni
Politicians from Bourges
French male non-fiction writers
French general councillors
Writers from Bourges